Sea Shepherd I was a former fishing trawler owned by the Sea Shepherd Conservation Society. She was British-registered and acquired in 1978 with a grant from the Fund for Animals. This was the first ship that the Sea Shepherd Conservation Society bought. Her major action was ramming into the whaler MV Sierra and she later was scuttled by the captain, Paul Watson.

References 

Sea Shepherd Conservation Society ships
Scuttled vessels
Maritime incidents in 1980
Shipwrecks of Portugal
1960 ships
Ships built in England